In politics, floor leaders, also known as a caucus leader, are leaders of their respective political party in a body of a legislature.

Philippines 
In the Philippines each body of the bicameral Congress has a majority floor leader and a minority floor leader. For the Senate, there is the Majority Floor Leader of the Senate and the Minority Floor Leader of the Senate. For the House of Representatives there is the Majority Floor Leader of the House and the Minority Floor Leader of the House. Officeholders do not represent political parties but rather political groupings within each body.

United States

Senate 
In the United States Senate, they are elected by their respective party conferences to serve as the chief Senate spokespeople for their parties and to manage and schedule the legislative and executive business of the Senate. By custom, the Presiding Officer gives the floor leaders priority in obtaining recognition to speak on the floor of the Senate.

In the Senate's two-party system, the floor leaders are the spokespeople from both major parties, elected by their parties. As well, they serve essentially as executives of their parties within the Senate. The Floor Leaders are referred to as the Senate Majority Leader, who belongs to the party with the most Senators, and the Senate Minority Leader, who belongs to the other major party.

House of Representatives 
Similar positions exist in the United States House of Representatives, except that role of House Majority Leader normally goes to the second-highest member of the leadership of the majority party, because it traditionally elects its party leader to the position of Speaker, while House Minority Leader serves as floor leader of the "loyal opposition," and is the minority counterpart to the Speaker.

See also
 Majority Leader
 Minority leader
 Parliamentary leader

Leaders of the United States Congress